Golęczewo  is a village in the administrative district of Gmina Suchy Las, within Poznań County, Greater Poland Voivodeship, in west-central Poland.

External links 

 The website about the history of the village: www.goleczewo.com

References

Villages in Poznań County